Mehrestan County, formerly known as Zaboli County (is in Sistan and Baluchestan province, Iran. The capital of the county is the city of Zaboli. At the 2006 census, the region's population (as Ashar District of Sarbaz County and Zaboli District of Saravan County) was 43,749 in 9,227 households. In 2011, the name of the county changed to Mehrestan. The census in 2011 counted 62,756 people in 14,577 households, by which time the two districts had been separated from the their counties to form Mehrestan County. At the 2016 census, the county's population was 70,579 in 17,407 households.

Administrative divisions

The population history and structural changes of Mehrestan County's administrative divisions over three consecutive censuses are shown in the following table. The latest census shows two districts, four rural districts, and one city.

References

 

Counties of Sistan and Baluchestan Province